Ceyrankeçməz (also, Dzheiran-Kechmas, Dzheyran-Kechmas, and Dzheyrankechmaz) is a village in the Gobustan Rayon of Azerbaijan.  The village forms part of the municipality of Şıxzahırlı.

References 

Populated places in Gobustan District